Edward Robert Burda (born July 16, 1938) is an American former professional baseball player. The first baseman and right fielder appeared in 388 games in Major League Baseball (MLB) for the St. Louis Cardinals (1962, 1971), San Francisco Giants (1965–1966, 1969–1970), Milwaukee Brewers (1970) and Boston Red Sox (1972).

Born in St. Louis, Missouri, Burda graduated from Ritenour High School and attended Southern Illinois University and the University of Illinois at Urbana–Champaign. He spent 15 seasons (1958–1972) in professional baseball after signing with his original organization, the Cardinals.  Of his seven big-league seasons, the last four were spent exclusively at the MLB level.

As a major leaguer, Burda collected 142 career hits, including 21 doubles and 13 home runs. He batted .224 with 78 RBI.

Best season
 1971 with the Cardinals: Hit .296 and led National League with 14 pinch-hits

External links

 Bob Burda - Baseballbiography.com
 Retrosheet
Venezuelan Professional Baseball League

1938 births
Living people
American expatriate baseball players in Venezuela
Baseball players from St. Louis
Boston Red Sox players
Columbus Jets players
Illinois Fighting Illini baseball players
Major League Baseball first basemen
Major League Baseball right fielders
Memphis Chickasaws players
Milwaukee Brewers players
Phoenix Giants players
Portland Beavers players
Rochester Red Wings players
St. Louis Cardinals players
San Francisco Giants players
Tacoma Giants players
Tiburones de La Guaira players
Tigres de Aragua players